Urmston is a town in the Metropolitan Borough of Trafford, Greater Manchester, England.  The town, together with areas of Flixton and Davyhulme, contains 19 listed buildings that are recorded in the National Heritage List for England.  Of these, one is listed at Grade I, the highest of the three grades, one is at Grade II*, the middle grade, and the others are at Grade II, the lowest grade.  Until the arrival of the railway in 1872–73, Urmston was a village surrounded by a rural area, and it has since become largely residential and a commuter town.  The listed buildings include churches with items in the churchyard, houses and associated structures, and four war memorials.



Key

Buildings

References

Citations

Sources

Lists of listed buildings in Greater Manchester